Sleeping Dogs or Sleeping Dogs Lie may refer to:

Film
 Sleeping Dogs (1977 film), a New Zealand drama
 Sleeping Dogs (1997 film), a Canadian sci-fi film
 Sleeping Dogs Lie (1998 film), based on the true-life story of Ambrose Small
 Sleeping Dogs Lie (2005 film), a short film
 Sleeping Dogs Lie (2006 film), an American romantic black comedy 
 Sleeping Dogs (2018 film), based on the video game

Literature
 Sleeping Dogs, a 1995 novel by Sonya Hartnett
 Sleeping Dogs, a 1990 novel by William Garner
 Sleeping Dogs, a 1992 novel by Thomas Perry

Television
 Sleeping Dogs (TV series), a British late-night program 2000–2001
 "Sleeping Dogs" (Star Trek: Enterprise), a 2002 episode
 "Sleeping Dogs Lie" (House), a 2006 episode 
 "Sleeping Dogs Lie" (Only Fools and Horses), a 1985 episode 
 "Sleeping Dogs Lie", a 2004 episode of Third Watch

Other uses
 Sleeping Dogs (video game), 2012 
 "Sleeping Dogs", a song by Merril Bainbridge from the 1995 album The Garden

See also
Let Sleeping Dogs Lie (disambiguation)